Annabelle Rosales Rama-Gutierrez (born October 31, 1952), commonly known as Annabelle Rama, is a Filipino actress and talent manager with Spanish and Chinese descent. She is a native of Cebu and the wife of the 1960s Philippine cinema matinee idol, Eddie Gutierrez. She co-starred in My Monster Mom with her daughter.

Early life
Annabelle Rama was born on October 31, 1952 to Laurente Rama and Feliciana Rosal. Her Spanish-Filipino father was a ship captain, while she never met her Chinese-Filipino biological mother due to family complications. After the death of her stepmother, Annabelle moved to her half-sister's residence in Barangay Zapatera, Cebu City where she stayed during her teenage years.

She is a granddaughter of former Senator Vicente Rama, who was recognized as the Father of Cebu City.

Personal life
Annabelle Rama married actor Eddie Gutierrez on November 8, 1980 in Los Angeles. She first met Gutiérrez as a fan when the latter was only 24 years old during an event in Cebu. The two later met again in Manila, where Rama became an actress in her own right. They had six children including Ruffa and Richard Gutierrez who became actors, and Raymond Gutierrez who became a TV host.
She is also stepmother to Tonton Gutierrez and Ramon Christopher Gutierrez, her husband's two sons from previous relationships.

Due to her birthday falling a day before All Saints Day, Rama customarily celebrates her birthday in advance.

Political career
In 2013, Rama attempted to enter politics. She made a bid to become Cebu City's 1st District representative in the House of Representatives elections under the United Nationalist Alliance party. She lost her congressional bid to Raul del Mar.

Filmography
Umaapoy na Bakal (1962)
Adiong Sikat ng Tondo (1962)
Lover for Hire (1970)
Uhaw (1970)
Hayok (1970)
Hidhid (1971)
Ibigay Mo Sa Akin ang Langit (1975)
Ako ang Nagbayo, Nagsaing, Iba ang Kumain (1975)
My Monster Mom (2008)
M&M: The Mall, The Merrier (2019)

References

External links 
 

1952 births
Actresses from Cebu
Annabelle
Filipino television actresses
Filipino film actresses
Filipino television personalities
Living people
Filipino people of Spanish descent
Filipino people of Chinese descent
Filipino women comedians